Raymond Leon Roker is the Global Head of Editorial at Amazon Music. He is of Bahamian and Jewish descent.

Roker is a former (and part-time) electronic music DJ and club promoter. In the 1980s and 1990s he was a graffiti artist in Los Angeles, producing numerous murals around the city and doing commercial work for television and films. He co-founded Urb (magazine) magazine in December 1990. Examples of his design work can be found in the collection of the Cooper Hewitt, Smithsonian Design Museum.

References

External links
Early 1990s Raymond Roker Mixtapes

1968 births
Living people
Bahamian artists
American people of Jewish descent
American people of Bahamian descent